The District Council of Eudunda was a local government area in South Australia from 1932 to 1997. The central town and council seat was Eudunda. It was established on 12 May 1932 with the amalgamation of the District Council of Julia and the District Council of Neales. By 1936, it was divided up into four wards: Brownlow, Eudunda and Neales (two councillors each) and Julia (three councillors). It met at the District Hall at Eudunda, which had formerly been owned by the Neales council, until 1963. The council existed until 1997, when it amalgamated with the District Council of Burra Burra, the District Council of Hallett and the District Council of Robertstown to form the Regional Council of Goyder.

Chairmen

 A. G. Wiesner (1932–1933) 
 Herbert Michael (1933–1941) 
 Clarence Albert Mann (1941–1947) 
 Hermann Oskar Leditschke (1947–1950) 
 Leslie Nicholson (1950–1951) 
 George Hambour (1951–1957) 
 George Carl Pfitzner (1957–1966) 
 Hedley Gordon Hambour (1966–1972) 
 Walter Theodor Hage (1972–1973) 
 Ralph Ewens Carter (1973–1985) 
 Frank Martin Mosey (1985–?)

References

Eudunda